The Fleetwings Model 33 was a 1940s American primary trainer prototype airplane built by Fleetwings.

Development
During 1940, the Fleetwings company designed and built a two-seat primary trainer, the Model 33. Although the company were experts with stainless-steel construction the aircraft was built from light-alloy. It was a cantilever low-wing monoplane with a conventional tail unit and fixed tailwheel landing gear, powered by Franklin 6AC piston engine. The instructor and pupil were accommodated in two tandem open cockpits. Only the prototype was built.

Specifications (Model 33)

References

 The Illustrated Encyclopedia of Aircraft (part work 1982-1985), 1985, Orbis Publishing

1940s United States civil trainer aircraft
33
Low-wing aircraft
Single-engined tractor aircraft
Aircraft first flown in 1940